Scientists, Technologists and Artists Generating Exploration (STAGE) was created in 2005 to encourage collaboration between artists and scientists. Originally, it began as a partnership between the Professional Artists Lab and the California NanoSystems Institute at the University of California, Santa Barbara. STAGE, which is housed at California NanoSystems Institute, hosts a biennial international script competition and a Collaboratory.

The founder and director of STAGE is Nancy Kawalek, a Studio Professor at the University of California, Santa Barbara.

Script Competition 
The STAGE International Script Competition awards a $10,000 prize to the best new play about science and technology.

Past Judges 
A panel of artists and scientists serve as jurors for each cycle of the competition.
Judges have included 
Pulitzer Prize- and Tony Award-winning playwright David Auburn
Tony-, Oliver-, and Obie Award–winning playwright John Guare
Pulitzer Prize–winning playwright David Lindsay-Abaire
Nobel Laureate in physics Sir Anthony Leggett, KBE
Nobel Laureate in chemistry Alan Heeger
Nobel Laureate in physics David Gross

Past winners 
Playwrights who have won the competition include
Jamie Pachino for Splitting Infinity
Elyse Singer for Frequency Hopping
Anna Ziegler for Photograph 51
Craig Baxter for The Altruists

The Collaboratory 
In 2009, STAGE launched The Collaboratory, an artistic laboratory for the development of theatrical works that have a multi-media component and that feature science and technology. The first play being created in The Collaboratory is The Brain Project.

The Brain Project 
Participants of The Brain Project include

 Alyssa Anderson
 Dwier Brown
 Michael Gazzaniga, PhD
 Angela Goethals
 Scott Grafton, MD
 Geoffrey Grinstein, PhD
 Nancy Kawalek
 Kenneth Kosik, MD
 James Lashly
 Maurizio Seracini, PhD
 Deb Norton

References

External links 
STAGE
Professional Artists Lab
CNSI
Dwier Brown at the Internet Movie Database
Angela Goethals at the Internet Movie Database
James Lashly at the Internet Movie Database
Jamie Pachino at the Internet Movie Database

University of California, Santa Barbara
Dramatist and playwright awards
Theatre awards